Friedrich Adolf Ferdinand, Freiherr von Flotow /flo:to/ (27 April 1812 – 24 January 1883) was a German composer. He is chiefly remembered for his opera Martha, which was popular in the 19th century and the early part of the 20th.

Life
Born in Teutendorf, in Mecklenburg, into an aristocratic family, Flotow was French-trained. Although he was intended for a diplomatic career, his father acceded to his wishes and he studied at the Conservatoire de Paris under Anton Reicha. During this time came under the influence of Auber, Rossini, Meyerbeer, Donizetti, Halévy, and later Gounod and Offenbach. These influences are reflected in his operas, where a distinctive French opéra comique flavour exists.

During the 1830 revolution he returned home, writing chamber music and operetta until it was safe to return to Paris. He completed his first opera in 1835, Pierre et Cathérine, but his breakthrough came with Le naufrage de la Méduse (1839), based on the wreck of the warship Méduse. The three-act romantic opera Alessandro Stradella of 1844 is recognized as one of Flotow's finer works. Martha was first staged in Vienna at the Theater am Kärntnertor on 25 November 1847, and soon became one of the best-loved of all his operas.

In 1848 revolution again drove Flotow home. Between 1856 and 1863 he served as Intendant of the court theatre at Schwerin. From 1863 he lived in either Paris or Vienna, and he had the satisfaction of seeing his operas mounted as far away as Saint Petersburg and Turin. He died in Darmstadt.

Works

Operas

In all, Flotow wrote about 30 operas. Many of these works were performed in different versions and under different titles, in German, French and sometimes other languages. Some survive, some are lost. All but Martha have fallen into obscurity, and even Martha is not nearly as often performed now as it was a century ago, though it is still sometimes staged, and there have been a number of attempts to revive other Flotow works (including Alessandro Stradella) during recent years.

The best-known single piece by Flotow is probably "Ach! so fromm, ach! so traut". It has been much recorded in its Italian version, "M’apparì tutt’amor".

Ballets

Notes

References

Cohen, Peter (1992), "Flotow, Friedrich" in The New Grove Dictionary of Opera, ed. Stanley Sadie (London)

External links
 
 
 
 Friedrich von Flotow recordings at the Discography of American Historical Recordings.

1812 births
1883 deaths
19th-century classical composers
19th-century German composers
19th-century German male musicians
Barons of Germany
Conservatoire de Paris alumni
German male classical composers
German opera composers
German Romantic composers
Male opera composers
People from the Grand Duchy of Mecklenburg-Schwerin
Pupils of Anton Reicha